Giovanni Francesco Ugolini (born 28 February 1953) was a Captain Regent of San Marino together with Andrea Zafferani for the semester from 1 October 2010 to 1 April 2011. He was previously Captain Regent from 1 April to 1 October 2002.

References

1953 births
Captains Regent of San Marino
Members of the Grand and General Council
Living people
Sammarinese Christian Democratic Party politicians